Argyrophis is a genus of snakes in the family Typhlopidae.

Distribution
The 12 species of the genus Argyrophis are found throughout Asia.

Species
The following species are recognized as being valid.
Argyrophis bothriorhynchus 
Argyrophis diardii 
Argyrophis fuscus 
Argyrophis giadinhensis 
Argyrophis hypsobothrius 
Argyrophis klemmeri 
Argyrophis koshunensis 
Argyrophis muelleri 
Argyrophis oatesii 
Argyrophis roxaneae 
Argyrophis siamensis 
Argyrophis trangensis 

Nota bene: A binomial authority in parentheses indicates that the species was originally described in a genus other than Argyrophis.

References

Further reading
Gray JE (1845). Catalogue of the Specimens of Lizards in the Collection of the British Museum. London: Trustees of the British Museum. (Edward Newman, printer). xxviii + 289 pp. (Argyrophis, new genus, p. 136).
Pyron RA, Wallach V (2014). "Systematics of the blindsnakes (Serpentes: Scolecophidia: Typhlopoidea) based on molecular and morphological evidence". Zootaxa 3829: 1-81. (Genus Argyrophis, p. 53).

 
Snake genera
Taxa named by John Edward Gray